The Murg  or Hauensteiner Murg is a river  and right tributary of the High Rhine in the district of Waldshut in Baden-Württemberg in Germany. The Murg reaches the Rhine at the municipality of Murg.

See also
List of rivers of Baden-Württemberg

References

Rivers of Baden-Württemberg
Rivers of the Black Forest
Rivers of Germany